Carlota Petchamé Bonastre (born 25 June 1990) is a Spanish field hockey forward who is a part of the Spain women's national field hockey team.

She was part of the Spanish team at the 2016 Summer Olympics in Rio de Janeiro, where they finished eighth. On club level, she plays for Júnior Fútbol Club in Spain.

References

External links
 
http://www.enciclopedia.cat/EC-EEC-13654.xml
http://www.wangconnection.com/seleccion-espanola-femenina-de-hockey-carlota-petchame/
http://www.diarideterrassa.es/deportes/2015/07/04/carlota-petchame-fichado-junior/2973.html
http://www.diarideterrassa.es/deportes/2016/06/24/carlota-petchame-berta-bonastre-alcanzan-cien-partidos-seleccion-espanola/33041.html
http://www.elperiodico.com/es/noticias/deportes/cinco-mujeres-olimpicas-reivindican-deporte-femenino-5346873
http://www.laxarxa.com/latarda/noticia/conversa-amb-carlota-petchame
http://www.terrassadigital.cat/detall_actualitat/?id=14947
http://www.naciodigital.cat/latorredelpalau/noticia/53930/gol/petcham/maquilla/nova/derrota/seleccio/femenina

1990 births
Living people
Olympic field hockey players of Spain
Field hockey players at the 2016 Summer Olympics
Field hockey players at the 2020 Summer Olympics
Spanish female field hockey players
Place of birth missing (living people)
Female field hockey forwards